Jairampur cemetery is a World War II cemetery in Arunachal Pradesh, India. It is located 7 km from Jairampur, Changlang district, and 25 km from Pangsau Pass, the Indo-Myanmar Border on the road to Ledo. It was discovered in 1997.

A signboard reads, "These graves bear silent testimony to those soldiers, unlisted workers and laborer's who ventured into virgin jungle amid blistering heat and laid down their lives in the line of duty during the second world war, whilst part of the All Forces against the Imperial Japanese Army."

The Department of Tourism, Government of Arunachal Pradesh is renovating the site.

References

Cemeteries in India
World War II cemeteries
Changlang district
1940s establishments in India
Cemeteries established in the 1940s